Anna Aleksandrovna Alminova (born 17 January 1985) is a Russian middle-distance runner who specializes in the 1500 metres.  She was the European indoor champion in the 1500 m in 2009, but lost the title when she was found to have been doping.

Career

In the 800 metres, she finished fifth at the 2003 World Youth Championships. In the 1500 metres, she won the silver medal at the 2004 World Junior Championships, finished eighth at the 2005 European Indoor Championships and eleventh at the 2008 Olympic Games. At the 2009 European Indoor Championships she won the gold medal in the 1500 m.  She reached the semi-finals of the event at the 2009 World Championships in Athletics in August and was seventh at the 2009 IAAF World Athletics Final.

Doping 

She had her best ever global level performance in Doha at the 2010 IAAF World Indoor Championships, running 4:09.81 for seventh place in the 1500 m final. However, she tested positive for pseudoephedrine at the championships as a result of having taken an over-the-counter medicine to treat a cold. She received a ban for three months – a light sentence to reflect the low-level seriousness of the drug and that she had not ingested the substance for competitive reasons.

Alminova was sanctioned for doping after her biological passport had showed abnormalities. The ban was for two years and six months and ran from 16 January 2011 to 15 May 2014. Her results was annulled from 16 February 2009.

International competitions

See also
List of doping cases in athletics
Russia at the World Athletics Championships
Doping at the World Athletics Championships

References

External links

1985 births
Living people
Sportspeople from Kirov, Kirov Oblast
Russian female middle-distance runners
Olympic female middle-distance runners
Olympic athletes of Russia
Athletes (track and field) at the 2008 Summer Olympics
Russian Athletics Championships winners
Russian sportspeople in doping cases
Doping cases in athletics